Annabel Fay is the debut studio album by New Zealand recording artist Annabel Fay. The album was released on August 21, 2007 through Siren Records. The album and earned her a Vodafone NZ Music Award nomination for Best Female Artist in 2008.

Chart performance

Annabel Fay entered the New Zealand Top 40 Albums chart at #40 on August 27, 2007, and peaked at #30 on September 3, 2007. The album spent a total of 2 weeks on the chart.

Track listing

Notes
Track 13, "Sleep Come Free Me" is a bonus hidden track and a cover of the original 1979 version performed by James Taylor.

References

2007 debut albums
Annabel Fay albums